Saint-Herblon is a former commune in the Loire-Atlantique department in western France. On 1 January 2016, it was merged into the new commune of Vair-sur-Loire.

See also
Communes of the Loire-Atlantique department

References

Saintherblon
Populated places disestablished in 2016